The 2018 AFC U-19 Championship qualification was an international men's under-19 football competition to decide the participating teams for the 2018 AFC U-19 Championship.

A total of 16 teams qualified to play in the final tournament, including Indonesia who qualified automatically as hosts.

Draw
Of the 47 AFC member associations, a total of 43 teams entered the competition. The final tournament hosts Indonesia also entered in qualification despite having automatically qualified for the final tournament (they had not been confirmed as hosts at the time of the qualification draw).

The draw was held on 21 April 2017, 16:00 MYT (UTC+8), at the AFC House in Kuala Lumpur, Malaysia. The 43 teams were drawn into ten groups: three groups of five teams and seven groups of four teams. For the draw, teams were divided into two zones:
West: 22 teams from West Asia, Central Asia and South Asia, to be drawn into five groups: two groups of five teams and three groups of four teams (Groups A–E).
East: 21 teams from ASEAN and East Asia, to be drawn into five groups: one group of five teams and four groups of four teams (Groups F–J).

The teams were seeded in each zone according to their performance in the 2016 AFC U-19 Championship final tournament and qualification (overall ranking shown in parentheses; NR stands for non-ranked teams). The following restrictions were also applied:
The eight teams which indicated their intention to serve as qualification group hosts prior to the draw were drawn into separate groups.

Notes
Teams in bold qualified for the final tournament.
(H): Qualification group hosts (* Jordan replaced Iran as group hosts, Chinese Taipei chosen as group hosts after the draw, remaining group hosted at neutral venue, after Australia chosen as group hosts after the draw but later replaced)
(Q): Final tournament hosts, automatically qualified regardless of qualification results
(W): Withdrew after draw

Player eligibility
Players born on or after 1 January 1999 are eligible to compete in the tournament.

Format
In each group, teams play each other once at a centralised venue. The ten group winners and the five best runners-up qualify for the final tournament. If the final tournament hosts Indonesia win their group or are among the five best runners-up, the sixth best runner-up also qualifies for the final tournament.

Tiebreakers
Teams are ranked according to points (3 points for a win, 1 point for a draw, 0 points for a loss), and if tied on points, the following tiebreaking criteria are applied, in the order given, to determine the rankings (Regulations Article 9.3):
Points in head-to-head matches among tied teams;
Goal difference in head-to-head matches among tied teams;
Goals scored in head-to-head matches among tied teams;
If more than two teams are tied, and after applying all head-to-head criteria above, a subset of teams are still tied, all head-to-head criteria above are reapplied exclusively to this subset of teams;
Goal difference in all group matches;
Goals scored in all group matches;
Penalty shoot-out if only two teams are tied and they met in the last round of the group;
Disciplinary points (yellow card = 1 point, red card as a result of two yellow cards = 3 points, direct red card = 3 points, yellow card followed by direct red card = 4 points);
Drawing of lots.

Groups
The matches were played between 24 October – 8 November 2017.

Group A
All matches were held in Kyrgyzstan.
Times listed are UTC+6.

Group B
All matches were held in Tajikistan.
Times listed are UTC+5.

Group C
All matches were held in Qatar.
Times listed are UTC+3.

Group D
All matches were held in Saudi Arabia.
Times listed are UTC+3.

Group E
All matches were held in Jordan; matches were due to be held in Iran, but were moved.
Times listed are UTC+2.

Group F
All matches were held in South Korea.
Times listed are UTC+9.

Group G
All matches were held in Cambodia.
Times listed are UTC+7.

Group H
All matches were held in Chinese Taipei.
Times listed are UTC+8.

Group I
All matches were held in Mongolia.
Times listed are UTC+8.

Group J
All matches were held in Vietnam (neutral venue host); matches were due to be held in Australia, but were moved after Australian Foreign Minister Julie Bishop refused the North Korean team entry into Australia.
Times listed are UTC+7.

Ranking of second-placed teams
Due to groups having different number of teams and the withdrawal of Afghanistan and Northern Mariana Islands from Groups C and J, the results against the fifth and fourth-placed teams in five and four-team groups are not considered for this ranking.

Qualified teams
The following 16 teams qualified for the final tournament.

1 Bold indicates champions for that year. Italic indicates hosts for that year.
2 As South Vietnam

Goalscorers

References

External links
, the-AFC.com
AFC U-19 Championship 2018, stats.the-AFC.com

Qualification
AFC U-19 Championship qualification
U-19 Championship qualification
AFC U-19 Championship qualification
October 2017 sports events in Asia
November 2017 sports events in Asia